John Turpin is a male former boxer who competed for England.

Boxing career
He represented England and won a bronze medal in the 75 kg middleweight, at the 1966 British Empire and Commonwealth Games in Kingston, Jamaica.

He was a member of the Rothwell Colliery ABC and was 1966 Light Welterweight ABA champion runner-up.

References

English male boxers
Commonwealth Games bronze medallists for England
Boxers at the 1966 British Empire and Commonwealth Games
Commonwealth Games medallists in boxing
Middleweight boxers
Medallists at the 1966 British Empire and Commonwealth Games